Vizion Plus is a national privately owned channel established in 1999 in Tirana, Albania. The channel started as a local station and a few years later began broadcasting all over Albanian territory, covering about 80% of audience and with a market share of 30–35%. Vizion Plus is rated among the most preferred television stations by Albanians, domestically and abroad.

Vizion Plus operates 24 hours a day, seven days a week through a network located throughout Albania. A professional staff with field experience in broadcasting provides a high level of communication with audiences. The channel has positioned itself as provider of high quality innovative television programs and as the authoritative voice in Albania for news and current affairs programs.  Programs and documentary in the form of a guide or aesthetic dialogue as well as a communication through the reflection of cultural phenomena, which attract attention and raise awareness. Winner of several awards for productions in the documentary genre.

Programs
Vizion Plus bought the rights to Zonë e Lirë, 2007-2011, considered as the highest rated talk show hosted by a former news editor, Arian Çani. The channel collaborates with the famous film studios Sony Pictures Universal and Paramount Picture, and has succeeded, with media partners, in the production of quality programmes such as editions of Miss Albania 2006, 2007 and 2008, Albanian Clip Nights, Miss Globe 2008, Editions of Shkodra Jazz Festival, Jazz Fest Tirana, the 5th edition of the Microphone Festival of Arts and editions of Cult Awards Academy.
 
In collaboration with Tring Digital, Vizion Plus successfully bought the rights of the first Albanian edition of Dancing with the Stars and improvised comedy show Apartmenti 2XL. These two shows produced record audiences. Every Wednesday, Vizion Plus airs Uefa Champions League matches with hosts Eva Murati and Andi Nuraj.

Awards and controversies
Vizion Plus has won the following awards: First Prize at the International Festival "Orsini" for best documentary film, the Award "Cult 2005" for the documentary cycle "Tunnel" and 5 awards given by the Academy of Radio and TV Annual Evaluation.
Mero Baze, the anchor of investigative show Faktori Plus was assaulted by a businessman at a Tirana restaurant. In 2010, Baze's show was ordered to close down.

Programs

Nationally created shows

International TV shows

See also
Television in Albania
Communication in Albania
Tring
Tip TV
Tring Sport HD
TV Klan

References

Television networks in Albania
Television channels and stations established in 1999
Mass media in Tirana
1999 establishments in Albania